Beatrix de Courtenay (died after 1245) was a Titular Countess of Edessa and Countess consort of Henneberg as the wife of Otto von Botenlauben. She was the eldest daughter of Agnes of Milly (de) and Joscelin III, Count of Edessa, who sold Chastel Neuf and Toron to the Teutonic order. She was named after Joscelin’s mother.

Beatrix married firstly William of Valence. By 1208 Beatrix married Otto whom she bore sons Otto and Henry.

In 1220 Beatrix de Courtenay and her husband  sold their land in Galilee, including  "one third of the fief of St. George", and  "one third of the village of Bokehel", to the Teutonic Knights. 

Otto and Beatrix founded the Cistercian cloister of Frauenroth in 1231, where both are buried.

References

Sources

 

 

1st house of Courtenay
Counts of Edessa
13th-century women rulers